Zinc finger protein 277 is a protein that in humans is encoded by the ZNF277 gene.

References

Further reading